Karyam Nissaram was an Indian Malayalam-language  comedy drama serial written and directed by Unni Cherian. This serial started airing from 1 October 2012 on Kairali TV and concluded with a total of 1104 episodes. Karyam Nissaram was the longest running serial on Kairali TV.

Plot

The show tells the story of husband and wife, Mohanakrishnan (Aneesh Ravi) and Sathyabhama (Anu Joseph). Mohanakrishnan is an honest, punctual and disciplined Village Officer and Sathyabhama is a smart, bold and independent Lawyer by profession. Each day a different theme is taken up and solved. Both the husband and wife have a strong opinion on any social or familial issue. The difference of opinion between them and how they take it all in the ride forms the major theme of the serial. The serial, in a very humorous tone, takes up socially relevant issues and presents the two extreme view points. The husband, a very strong believer of the values of Gandhi and the wife, a very modern woman, their opinions on issues are never the same. The serial, in fact, shows how differences of opinion need not be a negative element in the married life and how one can find humour in all these situations.

Cast
 Aneesh Ravi as K. Mohanakrishnan, Village Officer
 Anu Joseph as Adv. Sathyabhama, Mohanakrishnan's wife
 Kishore N. K. as Uthaman
 Thirumala Ramachandran as Shishupalan, Peon at Village office
 Sangeetha Rajendran as Swayamprabha, Clerk at Village office
 Prajusha Gowri as Kanchana, Clerk at the Village office
 Roslin as Mohanakrishnan's mother
 Amrutha Varnan as Mohanakrishnan's sister
 Anila Sreekumar as Advocate
 Sethu Lakshmi as Meenakshiyamma
 Karthika Kannan
 Sajan Surya
 Balaji Sharma as Advocate
 Indulekha S
 Yamuna Mahesh 
 Sumi Santhosh

Awards

References

Malayalam-language television shows
2010s Malaysian television series
2012 Malaysian television series debuts